The Summer Play Festival (SPF) was a theatre festival held in New York, USA.

Description
The annual four-week Summer Play Festival took place during the summer months at the Public Theater in New York City. It was founded by Broadway producer Arielle Tepper Madover and staged new plays and musicals by emerging writers. The first Summer Play Festival was presented in 2004, introducing a $10 ticket price that was a key feature of the event for its entire run.  A year later in 2005, The Living Room for Artists, Inc. was formed as a non-profit organization to ensure that the Festival perpetuates its goals, and whose central mission is to both fuel the growth of emerging theatre artists and encourage people of all ages to create, attend and work in the theatre.  Unlike the New York International Fringe Festival, there was no application fee and each production was allotted a significant budget. The SPF organization handled all the marketing and maintained no long-term rights to the plays and musicals showcased. The Festival's advertising blanketed New York during the summer, with television, newspaper, and magazine ads.  Bus stops and street posters also advertized the event.

100 emerging playwrights and composers, and around 1000 directors, designers, and other theatre artists worked at the Festival during its six-year run.  The Festival had a successful track record in identifying emerging talent:  SPF’s writers and artists have gone on to receive numerous awards and accolades, and productions on Broadway, off-Broadway, regionally and internationally.  Many have also developed projects with major film and television companies. The New York Times, Variety, and numerous other newspapers lauded Tepper's vision of creating affordable theatre for audiences, and a unique creative opportunity for emerging and established artists.

Other Festival programs included concerts, panels, salons, and forums developed in conjunction with Time Out New York and the NYC Mayor's Office of Film, Theatre and Broadcasting, a university internship program, a play commissioning program, and residency programs with the Donmar Warehouse, the National Theatre of Great Britain, and a number of Festivals in Europe.

Artists included Ally Sheedy, Mary Beth Peil, Marin Hinkle, John Gould Rubin, Annie Parisse, Katherine Waterston, Stew, Annie Golden, Adam Gwon, Jeremy Schonfeld, Georgia Stitt, Sam Gold, Beau Willimon, Christopher Gattelli, Trip Cullman, Jordan Harrison, Chloe Moss, Evan Cabnet, Kristoffer Diaz, Adam Driver, J.T. Rogers, and Quiara Hudes.

Past Festivals
2009
 The Chimes by Kevin Christopher Snipes, directed by Adam Immerwahr
 Departure Lounge by Dougal Irvine, directed by Christopher Gattelli
 Reborning by Zayd Dohrn, directed by Kip Fagan
 The Happy Sad by Ken Urban, directed by Trip Cullman
 The Sacrifices by Alena Smith, directed by Sam Gold
 Tender by Nicki Bloom, directed by Daniella Topol
 We Declare You A Terrorist by Tim J. Lord, directed by Niegel Smith
 Whore by Rick Viede, directed by Stephen Brackett

2008
 The Black Suits music & lyrics by Joe Iconis, book by Joe Iconis & Robert Maddock, directed by John Simpkins
 Esther Demsack by Billy Finnegan, directed by Stafford Arima
 Future Me by Stephen Brown, directed by Joanna Settle
 Green Girl by Sarah Hammond, directed by Wendy McClellan
 Neighborhood 3: Requisition of Doom by Jennifer Haley, directed by Kerry Whigham
 Tell Out My Soul by Jacquelyn Honess-Martin, directed by Evan Cabnet
 The Ones That Flutter by Sylvia Reed, directed by Stephen Brackett
 Tio Pepe by Matthew Lopez, directed by Caitlin Moon

2007
 Alice in War by Steven Bogart, directed by Alice Reagan
 Blueprint by Bixby Elliot, directed by Jonathan Silverstein
 Cipher by Cory Hinkle, directed by Kip Fagan
 Devil Land by Desi Moreno-Penson, directed by Jose Zayas
 Flesh and the Desert by Carson Kreitzer, directed by Beth Milles
 The Gabriels by Van Badham, directed by Rebecca Patterson
 Half of Plenty by Lisa Dillman, directed by Meredith McDonough
 Lower Ninth by Beau Willimon, directed by Daniel Goldstein
 Minor Gods by Charles Forbes, directed by Gaye Taylor Upchurch
 Missing Celia Rose by Ian August, directed by Adam Immerwahr
 My Wandering Boy by Julie Marie Myatt, directed by John Gould Rubin
 The Nightshade Family by Ruth McKee, directed by Shelley Butler
 Not Waving by Ellen Melaver, directed by Douglas Mercer
 Novel by Anna Ziegler, directed by Michael Goldfried
 Unfold Me by Joy Tomasko, directed by Linsay Firman
 Vrooommm! A NASComedy by Janet Allard, directed by David Lee

2006
 The Butcherhouse Chronicles by Michael P. Hidalgo, directed by Thomas Caruso
 Father Joy by Sheri Wilner, directed by Pam MacKinnon
 The Fearless by Etan Frankel, directed by Scott Schwartz
 Gardening Leave by Joanna Pinto, directed by Michael Goldfried
 Hardball by Victoria Stewart, directed by Lou Jacob
 Hitting the Wall by Barbara Blumenthal-Ehrlich, directed by Drew Barr
 Marge by Peter Morris, directed by Alex Timbers
 Millicent Scowlworthy by Rob Handel, directed by Ken Rus Schmoll
 Sonia Flew by Melinda Lopez, directed by Justin Waldman
 Spain by Jim Knable, directed by Jeremy Dobrish
 Splitting Infinity by Jamie Pachino, directed by Matt Shakman
 The Squirrel by Alex Moggridge, directed by Patrick McNulty
 Swansong by Patrick Page, directed by David Muse
 Training Wisteria by Molly Smith Metzler, directed by Evan Cabnet
 A Wive’s Tale by Christina Ham, directed by Rosemary Andress

2005
 The Adventures of Barrio Grrrl! by Quiara Alegría Hudes, directed by Liesl Tommy
 Courting Vampires by Laura Schellhardt, directed by Lou Jacob
 crooked by Catherine Trieschmann, directed by Linsay Firman
 Ephemera by John Yearley, directed by Erma Duricko
 How Love is Spelt by Chloë Moss, directed by Michael Sexton
 Indoor/Outdoor by Kenny Finkle, directed by Daniel Goldstein
 Madagascar by J. T. Rogers, directed by Gus Reyes
 The Map Maker's Sorrow by Chris Lee, directed by Stefan Novinski
 Messalina by Gordon Dahlquist, directed by David Levine
 Mimesophobia by Carlos Murillo, directed by Matt August
 Sick by Zakiyyah Alexander, directed by Daniella Topol
 Split Wide Open by Christina Gorman, directed by Lisa Rothe
 Ted Kaczynski Killed People With Bombs by Michelle Carter, directed by Jeremy Dobrish
 tempOdyssey by Dan Dietz, directed by Randy White
 Welcome to Arroyo's by Kristoffer Diaz, directed by Jaime Castaneda
 Wildlife by Victor Lodato, directed by Michael Sexton

2004
 Anatomy 1968 by Karen Hartman, directed by Lisa Rothe
 Arrivals & Departures by Rogelio Martinez, directed by Lou Jacob
 Colorado by Peter Sinn Nachtrieb, directed by Tracy Ward
 Earthquake Chica by Anne Garcia-Romero, directed by Leah C. Gardiner
 El Paso Blue by Octavio Solis, directed by Juliette Carrillo
 Honor & The River by Anton Dudley, directed by Ken Schmoll
 It's Only Life: The Songs of John Bucchino by John Bucchino, directed by Daisy Prince
 Kid-Simple by Jordan Harrison, directed by Will Frears
 Kitty Kitty Kitty by Noah Haidle, directed by Carolyn Cantor
 Mayhem by Kelly Stuart, directed by Melissa Kievman
 Pink by Heather Lynn MacDonald, directed by Linsay Firman
 Prozak & the Platypus by Elise Thoron and Jill Sobule, directed by Rebecca Taichman Prozak and the Platypus webbed site
 Sam & Lucy by Brooke Berman, directed by Trip Cullman
 Spin Moves by Ken Weitzman, directed by Suzanne Agins
 Stealing Sweets and Punching People by Phil Porter, directed by Michael Sexton
 Sweetness by Gary Sunshine, directed by Trip Cullman
 The Dew Point by Neena Beber, directed by William Carden
 Wet by Liz Duffy Adams, directed by Kent Nicholson

References

Theatre festivals in the United States
Summer festivals
Festivals in New York City
Recurring events established in 2004